How to Make a Mega Movie Deal was an attraction formerly located at Universal Studios Florida. It opened in 1991, a year after the park opened, and was closed in 1993 to make way for AT&T at the Movies. It was not much of a major attraction, though it was themed to Universal's and the rest of Hollywood's movie industry, and was similar to the park's Lucy: A Tribute attraction, also in the Hollywood area.

The attraction

Synopsis
In 1990, Universal Studios Florida released this official synopsis:

Summary
The exterior facade of the building was themed to The Hollywood Hotel in Los Angeles, California and The Garden of Allah in Hollywood. The attraction was a small exhibit themed to the movie industry, and included many exhibits, games, and videos about the industry. It also featured a small storyline of a man progressing from a mail room employee to a studio executive in Hollywood.

History

The attraction opened a year after the park, in Spring, 1991. It was closed in 1993, and was replaced by AT&T at the Movies, which opened in 1998 and was also removed, in 2001. The inside of the building was then turned into Cafe La Bamba, a seasonal restaurant, while the former entrance was converted into a Universal Express pass distribution area for the Woody Woodpecker's Kidzone area attractions, which was closed in 2007.

References

Amusement rides introduced in 1991
Amusement rides that closed in 1993
Former Universal Studios Florida attractions
Universal Parks & Resorts attractions by name
1991 establishments in Florida
1993 disestablishments in Florida